Carl West Rich (September 12, 1898 – June 26, 1972) was an American politician who served as Mayor of Cincinnati, three times from 1947 to 1948, 1951 to 1953, and 1955 to 1957 and Republican member of the U.S. House of Representatives from Ohio for one term from 1963 to 1965. He is the only Mayor of Cincinnati to go back to office two times.

Life and career
Rich was born in Cincinnati, Ohio. He attended Walnut Hills High School, the University of Cincinnati College of Liberal Arts, A.B., in 1922, and from the college of law of the same university, LL.B., in 1924. He was admitted to the bar in 1924 and commenced the practice of law in Cincinnati. He was an instructor on the faculty of the University of Cincinnati, and an assistant city solicitor and assistant prosecutor of Cincinnati from 1925 to 1929. He served three terms as prosecuting attorney of Hamilton County, Ohio, from 1938 to 1947. He served nine years in the city council of Cincinnati and served as mayor for three terms, from 1947 to 1956. He was judge of the Common Pleas Court of Hamilton County, and president and chairman of the board of the Cincinnati Royals Professional Basketball Team.

Congress 
Rich was elected as a Republican to the Eighty-eighth Congress. He was an unsuccessful candidate for reelection in 1964 to the Eighty-ninth Congress. He resumed the practice of law and died in Cincinnati on June 26, 1972. He is interred in Spring Grove Cemetery.

Sources

The Political Graveyard

1898 births
1972 deaths
Ohio lawyers
Ohio state court judges
Cincinnati City Council members
Mayors of Cincinnati
University of Cincinnati faculty
University of Cincinnati College of Law alumni
Burials at Spring Grove Cemetery
Cincinnati Royals
County district attorneys in Ohio
20th-century American judges
20th-century American politicians
20th-century American lawyers
Republican Party members of the United States House of Representatives from Ohio